Bucculatrix albaciliella is a moth in the family Bucculatricidae first described by Annette Frances Braun in 1910. It is found in California.

The wingspan is 8–9 mm. Adults have been recorded on wing in April.

References

External links

Bucculatricidae
Moths described in 1910
Moths of North America
Taxa named by Annette Frances Braun